Ambition, Ambitions or Ambitious may refer to:

Music 
 Ambitions (One Ok Rock album), 2017
 Ambition (Tommy Shaw album), 2014
 Ambition (Wale album), 2011, or the title song
 "Ambition", a song by Band-Maid from the 2021 album Unseen World
 "Ambition" (Miz song), 1999 J-pop song and album
 "Ambition" (Pepper song), 2008 reggae song
 "Ambitions" (song), 2009 song by Norwegian band Donkeyboy
 "Ambitious! Yashinteki de Ii Jan", 2006 song by Japanese band Morning Musume

Film and television
 Ambition (1916 film), a lost silent film drama directed by James Vincent
 Ambition (1939 film), a 1939 Argentine film directed by Adelqui Migliar
 Ambition (1991 film), a 1991 American thriller film
 Ambition (TV series), Hong Kong series around 1992
 Ambitions (TV series), a 2019 series on the Oprah Winfrey Network
 Ambition (2019 film), a 2019 American thriller film directed by Robert Shaye

Literature 
 Ambition (novel), a 1989 novel by Julie Burchill

Institutions 
 Ambition (charity), a British youth charity
 Ambition Institute of Technology in Varanasi, India

Others 

 The Sims 3: Ambitions, expansion pack for The Sims 3 video game
 Ambition (fragrance), a women's fragrance created by Jordin Sparks
 Ambition Formation, a geologic formation in British Columbia, Canada
 MS Ambition, cruise ship launched in 1999